A hair dryer, hairdryer or blow dryer is an electromechanical device that blows ambient or hot air over damp hair to speed the evaporation of water to dry the hair. Blow dryers enable better control over the shape and style of hair, by accelerating and controlling the formation of temporary hydrogen bonds within each strand. These bonds are powerful (allowing stronger hair shaping than the sulfur bonds formed by permanent waving products) but are temporary and extremely vulnerable to humidity. They disappear with a single washing of the hair.

Hairstyles using blow dryers usually have volume and discipline, which can be further improved with styling products, hairbrushes, and combs during drying to add tension, hold and lift.

Blow dryers were invented in the late 19th century. The first, stationary, model was created by Alexander F. Godefroy in his salon in France. The handheld, household hair dryer first appeared in 1920. Blow dryers are used in beauty salons by professional stylists and in the household by consumers.

Function

Most hair dryers consist of electric heating coils and a fan that blows the air (usually powered by a universal motor). The heating element in most dryers is a bare, coiled nichrome wire that is wrapped around mica insulators. Nichrome is used because of two important properties: It is a poor conductor of electricity and it does not oxidize when heated.

A survey of stores in 2007 showed that most hair dryers had ceramic heating elements (like ceramic heaters) because of their "instant heat" capability. This means that it takes less time for the dryers to heat up and for the hair to dry.

Many of these dryers have "normal mode" buttons that turn off the heater and blow room-temperature air while the button is pressed. This function helps to maintain the hairstyle by setting it. The colder air reduces frizz and can help to promote shine in the hair.

Many feature "ionic" operation, to reduce the build-up of static electricity in the hair, though the efficacy of ionic technology is of some debate. Manufacturers claim this makes the hair "smoother". Some stylists consider the introduction of ionic technology to be one of the most important advances in the beauty industry.

Hair dryers are available with attachments, such as diffusers, airflow concentrators, and comb nozzles. 
 A diffuser is an attachment that is used on hair that is fine, colored, permed or naturally curly. It diffuses the jet of air, so that the hair is not blown around while it dries. The hair dries more slowly, at a cooler temperature, and with less physical disturbance. This makes it so that the hair is less likely to frizz and it gives the hair more volume.
 An airflow concentrator does the opposite of a diffuser. It makes the end of the blow dryer narrower and thus helps to concentrate the heat into one spot to make it dry rapidly.
 The comb nozzle attachment is the same as the airflow concentrator, but it ends with comb-like teeth so that the user can dry the hair using the dryer without a brush or comb.

Hair dryers have been cited as an effective treatment for head lice and earwax-prevention.

Types 

Today there are two major types of blow dryers (hair dryers): the handheld and the rigid-hood dryer.

A hood dryer has a hard plastic dome that fits over a person's head to dry their hair. Hot air is blown out through tiny openings around the inside of the dome so the hair is dried evenly. Hood dryers are mainly found in hair salons.

Hair dryer brush 
A hair dryer brush (also called "hot air brush" and "round brush hair dryer" and "hair styler") has the shape of a brush and it is used as a volumizer too.

There are two types of round brush hair dryers – rotating and static. Rotating round brush hair dryers have barrels that rotate automatically while static round brush hair dryers don't.

History

In 1890 the first hairdryer was invented by French stylist Alexander Godefroy. His invention was a large, seated version that consisted of a bonnet that attached to the chimney pipe of a gas stove. Godefroy invented it for use in his hair salon in France, and it was not portable or handheld. It could only be used by having the person sit underneath it.

Armenian American inventor Gabriel Kazanjian was the first to patent a blow dryer in the United States, in 1911.

Around 1920, hair dryers began to go on the market in handheld form. This was due to innovations by National Stamping and Electricworks under the white cross brand, and later U.S. Racine Universal Motor Company and the Hamilton Beach Co., which allowed the dryer to be small enough to be held by hand. They also had many instances of overheating and electrocution. Hair dryers were only capable of using 100 watts, which increased the amount of time needed to dry hair (the average dryer today can use up to 2000 watts of heat).

Since the 1920s, development of the hair dryer has mainly focused on improving the wattage and superficial exterior and material changes. In fact, the mechanism of the dryer has not had any significant changes since its inception. One of the more important changes for the hair dryer is to be made of plastic, so that it is more lightweight. This really caught on in the 1960s with the introduction of better electrical motors and the improvement of plastics. Another important change happened in 1954 when GEC changed the design of the dryer to move the motor inside the casing.

The bonnet dryer was introduced to consumers in 1951. This type worked by having the dryer, usually in a small portable box, connected to a tube that went into a bonnet with holes in it that could be placed on top of a person's head. This worked by giving an even amount of heat to the whole head at once.

The 1950s also saw the introduction of the rigid-hood hair dryer which is the type most frequently seen in salons. It had a hard plastic helmet that wraps around the person's head. This dryer works similarly to the bonnet dryer of the 1950s but at a much higher wattage.

In the 1970s, the U.S. Consumer Product Safety Commission set up guidelines that hair dryers had to meet to be considered safe to manufacture. Since 1991 the CPSC has mandated that all dryers must use a ground fault circuit interrupter so that it cannot electrocute a person if it gets wet. By 2000, deaths by blowdryers had dropped to fewer than four people a year, a stark difference to the hundreds of cases of electrocution accidents during the mid-20th century.

Cultural references
The British historical drama television series Downton Abbey made note of the invention of the portable hairdryer (blow dryer) when a character purchased one in Series 6 Episode 9, set in the year 1925.

See also
Curling iron
Heat gun

References

External links

Hairdressing
Home appliances
Products introduced in 1920
19th-century inventions
French inventions
American inventions